Hanna Anatolyeuna Kanapatskaya or Anna Anatolyevna Kanopatskaya  (born 29 October 1976) is a Belarusian politician, former MP, lawyer, entrepreneur and candidate in the 2020 Belarusian presidential election. She is also a former parliamentary deputy, represented the United Civic Party of Belarus from 1995 to 2019 and served as an MP from 2016 to 2019. She is known for her political campaign on calling Belarus to be freed from Russian interference.

Biography 
Hanna Kanapatskaya was born in the late Soviet era on 29 October 1976 in Minsk. Her father Anatoly Trukhanovich is a dollar millionaire and her mother is a housewife. She completed her education at the Minsk School no 55 and graduated from the Faculty of Law at the Belarusian State University.

Political career 
She contested at the 2016 Belarusian parliamentary election representing the United Civic Party and was elected as a deputy of the House of Representatives. She won a seat in the 97th electoral district in the Kastryjčnickaja district of Minsk and was elected to the lower house of Belarus National Assembly as just one of only two opposition candidates along with Alena Anisim. The instance also made her and one other independent candidate to be the first opposition MPs being represented in parliament of Belarus since 2004.

She stepped down from the position of parliamentary deputy in 2019 after a fallout with the United Civic Party following the 2019 Belarusian parliamentary election, where the party failed to receive any seats. She also reported to have run for the position of member of parliament in 2019 but the signatures were invalidated by the Central Election Commission of Belarus.

2020 presidential election 

On 20 May 2020, she self nominated herself as an independent candidate as she decided to stand as an independent candidate following a fallout with United Civic Party in 2019. She also initially attempted to become a main single candidate from the opposition but her candidacy claim was rejected by other primaries. She applied for the registration on 12 May 2020.

On 10 June 2020, she claimed that she had received a total of 100,000 signatures as submissions to the Central Election Commission of Belarus and became the fourth candidate to receive 100,000 signatures and eventually became eligible to contest at the election. She also refused to take part in television debates prior to the election and during an interview in July 2020, she claimed that apart from President Alexander Lukashenko, other candidates were relatively weak and insisted that Lukashenko is the only major rival. She also revealed that she decided to run for presidency by claiming that people of Belarus have lost trust and confidence on Lukashenko's dictator rule for 26 years.

On 10 August 2020, the election results were released and Hanna clinched third place among the candidates with a total valid vote count of 1.68%.

References 

1976 births
21st-century Belarusian women politicians
21st-century Belarusian politicians
Belarusian lawyers
Businesspeople from Minsk
Members of the House of Representatives of Belarus
Politicians from Minsk
Living people
Belarusian State University alumni
Candidates for President of Belarus